Koetsu Okazaki  (born March 7, 1979) is a professional Japanese mixed martial artist who currently competes in the Bantamweight division for ONE Championship. A professional competitor since 2004, Okazaki has also formerly competed for Shooto and is the former Shooto Featherweight Champion as well as the former Shooto Pacific Rim Featherweight Champion.

Mixed martial arts career

Shooto
Okazaki won the 2004 Shooto rookie tournament in 2004 and then disappeared for 18 months before returning with back-to-back wins over Hiroyuki Tanaka and So Tazawa in front of his hometown Osaka crowd, earning his Class A Shooto license, and firmly planting himself in the minds of Shooto fans while intensifying the 132-pound class.

On October 18, 2009 Okazaki won Shooto's vacant 132-pound Pacific Rim Championship in the main event of Shooto GIG Tokyo 3 at Shinjuku FACE by beating Hiromasa Ogikubo via second-round TKO.

Okazaki won the Shooto 132-Pound World Championship at Shooto Tradition 2011 on April 29, 2011 at Tokyo Dome City Hall when he defeated Shuichiro Katsumura by TKO (punches).

On May 18, 2012 Okazaki made the first defence of his Shooto 132-Pound World Championship in a rematch with Ogikubo but was submitted in the third round.

ONE FC
On April 10, 2013 it was announced that Okazaki had signed with ONE Fighting Championship. He faced Bibiano Fernandes for the Interim ONE FC Bantamweight Championship at ONE FC: 'Rise to Power' at the SM Mall of Asia Arena in Manila on May 31. He lost the fight via unanimous decision.

Championships and accomplishments
Shooto
Shooto Featherweight Championship (One time)
Shooto Rookie Featherweight Championship (One time)
Shooto PRO Featherweight Championship (One time)

Mixed martial arts record

|-
| Loss
| align=center| 10-4-1
|Kevin Belingon
|Decision (unanimous)
|ONE FC: Warrior's Way
|
|align=center|3
|align=center|5:00
|Pasay, Philippines
|
|-
|-
| Win
| align=center| 10-3-1
| Yusup Saadulaev
| TKO (punches)
| ONE FC: War of Dragons
| 
| align=center| 2
| align=center| 4:21
| Taipei, Taiwan
| 
|-
| Win
| align=center| 9-3-1
| Joshua Alvarez
| Submission (rear-naked choke)
| ONE FC: Moment of Truth
| 
| align=center| 2
| align=center| 3:13
| Pasay, Philippines
| 
|-
| Loss
| align=center| 8-3-1
| Bibiano Fernandes
| Decision (unanimous)
| ONE FC: Rise to Power
| 
| align=center| 5
| align=center| 5:00
| Pasay, Philippines
| For ONE FC Interim Bantamweight Championship
|-
| Loss
| align=center| 8-2-1
| Hiromasa Ougikubo
| Submission (rear naked choke)
| Shooto: 5th Round
| 
| align=center| 3
| align=center| 3:32
| Tokyo, Japan
| 
|-
|  Win
| align=center| 8-1-1
| Shuichiro Katsumura
| TKO (punches) 
| Shooto: Shooto Tradition 2011
| 
| align=center| 2
| align=center| 2:24
| Tokyo, Japan
| 
|-
|  Win
| align=center| 7-1-1
| Tetsu Suzuki
| Decision (unanimous)
| Shooto: The Way of Shooto 4: Like a Tiger, Like a Dragon
| 
| align=center| 3
| align=center| 5:00
| Tokyo, Japan
| 
|-
|  Win
| align=center| 6-1-1
| Hiromasa Ougikubo
| TKO (punches)
| Shooto: Gig Tokyo 3
| 
| align=center| 2
| align=center| 2:08
| Tokyo, Japan
| 
|-
|  Loss
| align=center| 5-1-1
| Masakatsu Ueda
| Decision (unanimous) 
| Shooto: Back To Our Roots 8
|  
| align=center| 3
| align=center| 5:00
| Tokyo, Japan
| 
|-
|  Win
| align=center| 5-0-1
| Atsushi Yamamoto
| Decision (majority) 
| Shooto: Back To Our Roots 3
| 
| align=center| 3
| align=center| 5:00
| Tokyo, Japan
| 
|-
|  Win
| align=center| 4-0-1
| So Tazawa
| Decision (unanimous) 
| Shooto: Gig West 6
| 
| align=center| 3
| align=center| 5:00
| Osaka, Japan
| 
|-
|  Win
| align=center| 3-0-1
| Hiroyuki Tanaka
| Decision (majority)
| Shooto: Gig West 5
|  
| align=center| 3
| align=center| 5:00
| Osaka, Japan
| 
|-
| Draw
| align=center| 2-0-1
| So Tazawa
| Draw
| Shooto: Rookie Tournament 2004 Final
| 
| align=center| 2
| align=center| 5:00
| Setagaya, Japan
| 
|-
|  Win
| align=center| 2-0
| Takahiro Hosoi
| Decision (majority)
| Shooto: Gig Central 6
| 
| align=center| 2
| align=center| 5:00
| Nagoya, Japan
| 
|-
|  Win
| align=center| 1-0
| Takao Tamura
| Decision (unanimous) 
| Shooto 2004: 4/11 in Osaka Prefectural Gymnasium
|  
| align=center| 2
| align=center| 5:00
| Osaka, Japan
|

References

External links 

Japanese male mixed martial artists
Bantamweight mixed martial artists
Mixed martial artists utilizing judo
Mixed martial artists utilizing karate
Mixed martial artists utilizing shootboxing
Japanese male judoka
Japanese male karateka
1979 births
Living people